Rustam Mukhamedovich Mustafin (born 17 March 1977) is a Russian professional football coach and a former player. He made his debut in the Russian Premier League in 1996 for FC Torpedo-Luzhniki Moscow.

References

External links
 Profile at footballfacts  

1977 births
Living people
Russian footballers
Association football defenders
Russian expatriate footballers
Expatriate footballers in Belarus
Russian Premier League players
FC Torpedo Moscow players
FC Torpedo-2 players
FC Zhemchuzhina Sochi players
FC Rubin Kazan players
FC Baltika Kaliningrad players
FC Luch Vladivostok players
FC Gomel players
Russian football managers
FC FShM Torpedo Moscow players
FC Lukhovitsy players
FC Torpedo Vladimir players